Agnes Finnie (died 6 March 1645) was an Edinburgh shopkeeper and moneylender who was executed for witchcraft on 6 March 1645.

Biography 
Agnes Finnie, widow of James Roberston, sold consumer goods, such as fish and cakes in Potterrow, Edinburgh. She had a reputation for cursing people in her neighbourhood. She was charged with causing harm to several neighbours, including an attack on her neighbour, James Cochrane.

In June 1644, she was arrested on 20 counts of witchcraft and sorcery. She was tried on 20 December 1644 and executed on the Castle Hill of Edinburgh on Thursday, 6 March 1645.

Posthumous petition for pardon 
In 2008, Agnes Finnie's name was one of thousands presented for posthumous pardon to the Scottish Parliament.

References 

1645 deaths
Executed Scottish people
17th-century Scottish women
People executed for witchcraft
Witch trials in Scotland
17th-century Scottish businesspeople